Jaimehintonia is a genus of plants in the family Asparagaceae, subfamily Brodiaeoideae, first described in 1993. It contains only one known species, Jaimehintonia gypsophila, endemic to the State of Nuevo León in northeastern Mexico.

References

Brodiaeoideae
Monotypic Asparagaceae genera
Flora of Nuevo León
Endemic flora of Mexico